The 1999 Coupe de France Final was a football match held at Stade de France, Saint-Denis on 15 May 1999 that saw FC Nantes Atlantique defeat CS Sedan Ardennes from Division 2 1–0 thanks to a goal by Olivier Monterrubio.

Match details

See also
1998–99 Coupe de France

External links
Coupe de France results at Rec.Sport.Soccer Statistics Foundation
Report on French federation site

Coupe
1999
Coupe De France Final 1999
Coupe De France Final 1999
Coupe de France Final
Sport in Saint-Denis, Seine-Saint-Denis
Coupe de France Final